Lespinoy is a commune in the Pas-de-Calais department in the Hauts-de-France region of France.

Geography
A village situated 4 miles (6 km) southeast of Montreuil-sur-Mer on the D349 road and in the Canche valley.

Population

Places of interest
 The nineteenth century church of Saint-Maurice

See also
Communes of the Pas-de-Calais department

References

Communes of Pas-de-Calais